The following lists events that happened in 1952 in Libya.

Incumbents
Monarch: Idris 
Prime Minister: Mahmud al-Muntasir

Births
28 May - Mahmoud Jibril

 
Years of the 20th century in Libya
Libya
Libya
1950s in Libya